William Graham (born 1866 in Dreghorn, Scotland) was a footballer who played in the English Football League for Newcastle United and championship winning Preston North End.

Graham made his League debut on 8 September 1888 at centre-half for Preston North End against Burnley at Deepdale in Preston; his side won 5–2. He played in only five of Preston's 22 League Championship matches.

His brother Johnny was also a footballer and a teammate at Preston.

References

Scottish footballers
Newcastle United F.C. players
Preston North End F.C. players
English Football League players
1866 births
1937 deaths
Association football wing halves
Footballers from North Ayrshire
Newcastle East End F.C. players